Sherman Township may refer to:

Arkansas
 Sherman Township, Johnson County, Arkansas

Illinois
 Sherman Township, Mason County, Illinois

Iowa
 Sherman Township, Calhoun County, Iowa
 Sherman Township, Hardin County, Iowa
 Sherman Township, Jasper County, Iowa
 Sherman Township, Kossuth County, Iowa
 Sherman Township, Monona County, Iowa
 Sherman Township, Montgomery County, Iowa
 Sherman Township, Pocahontas County, Iowa
 Sherman Township, Sioux County, Iowa, in Sioux County, Iowa
 Sherman Township, Story County, Iowa

Kansas
 Sherman Township, Clay County, Kansas
 Sherman Township, Crawford County, Kansas
 Sherman Township, Decatur County, Kansas
 Sherman Township, Dickinson County, Kansas
 Sherman Township, Ellsworth County, Kansas
 Sherman Township, Grant County, Kansas
 Sherman Township, Leavenworth County, Kansas
 Sherman Township, Ottawa County, Kansas, in Ottawa County, Kansas
 Sherman Township, Pottawatomie County, Kansas, in Pottawatomie County, Kansas
 Sherman Township, Riley County, Kansas, in Riley County, Kansas
 Sherman Township, Sedgwick County, Kansas
 Sherman Township, Washington County, Kansas, in Washington County, Kansas

Michigan
 Sherman Township, Gladwin County, Michigan
 Sherman Township, Huron County, Michigan
 Sherman Township, Iosco County, Michigan
 Sherman Township, Isabella County, Michigan
 Sherman Township, Keweenaw County, Michigan
 Sherman Township, Mason County, Michigan
 Sherman Township, Newaygo County, Michigan
 Sherman Township, Osceola County, Michigan
 Sherman Township, St. Joseph County, Michigan

Minnesota
 Sherman Township, Redwood County, Minnesota

Missouri
 Sherman Township, Cass County, Missouri
 Sherman Township, Dallas County, Missouri
 Sherman Township, DeKalb County, Missouri
 Sherman Township, Harrison County, Missouri
 Sherman Township, Putnam County, Missouri

Nebraska
 Sherman Township, Antelope County, Nebraska
 Sherman Township, Cuming County, Nebraska
 Sherman Township, Gage County, Nebraska
 Sherman Township, Kearney County, Nebraska
 Sherman Township, Platte County, Nebraska

North Dakota
 Sherman Township, Bottineau County, North Dakota

Ohio
 Sherman Township, Huron County, Ohio

Oklahoma
 Sherman Township, Kingfisher County, Oklahoma

South Dakota
 Sherman Township, Brookings County, South Dakota
 Sherman Township, Corson County, South Dakota
 Sherman Township, Faulk County, South Dakota

See also

Sherman (disambiguation)

Township name disambiguation pages